Thero  is a village in Chanditala II community development block of Srirampore subdivision in Hooghly district in the Indian state of West Bengal.

Geography
Chanditala police station serves this Village.

Gram panchayat
Villages and census towns in Barijhati gram panchayat are: Barijhati, Beledanga, Gokulpur, Khanpur, Makhalpara and Thero.

Demographics
As per 2011 Census of India, Thero had a total population of 3,051 of which 1,579 (52%) were males and 1,472 (48%) were females. Population below 6 years was 264. The total number of literates in Thero was 2,129 (76.39% of the population over 6 years).

Transport
The nearest railway station is  Gobra  on the Howrah-Bardhaman chord line and is part of the Kolkata Suburban Railway system.

References 

Villages in Chanditala II CD Block